Una Noche de Luna is a live album released by Marco Antonio Solís on June 26, 2012. The concert was recorded at Estadio Luna Park, Buenos Aires, Argentina in 2011. A DVD will also come with the album.

Track listing

All songs written and composed by Marco Antonio Solís

DVD

Chart performance

Sales and certifications

References

2012 live albums
Marco Antonio Solís live albums
Fonovisa Records live albums
Spanish-language live albums
Albums recorded at Estadio Luna Park